Uma Sankar (born 31 July 2000) is an Indian professional footballer who plays as a midfielder for I-League club Chennai City.

Club career
Born in Tamil Nadu, Sankar began his career with Ozone.

Chennai City
In January 2021, Sankar joined I-League club Chennai City. He made his debut for the club on 29 January 2021 against Indian Arrows, coming on as a 91st minute substitute in a 1–0 victory.

Career statistics

References

External links
Profile at the All India Football Federation website

2000 births
Living people
People from Tamil Nadu
Indian footballers
Association football midfielders
Ozone FC players
Chennai City FC players
I-League players
Footballers from Tamil Nadu
I-League 2nd Division players